The Torrey Canyon oil spill was one of the world's most serious oil spills. The supertanker  ran aground on rocks off the south-west coast of the United Kingdom in 1967, spilling an estimated 25–36 million gallons (94–164 million litres) of crude oil. Attempts to mitigate the damage included the bombing of the wreck by aircraft from the Royal Navy and Royal Air Force. Hundreds of miles of coastline in Britain, France, Guernsey, and Spain were affected by the oil and other substances used in an effort to mitigate damage.

At the time, that was world's worst oil spill; it remains the worst spill in UK history.  It led to significant changes in maritime law and oil spill responses.

Background

When laid down in the United States in 1959, Torrey Canyon had a capacity of 60,000 tons; the ship was later enlarged to 120,000 tons in Japan.  She was named for a geographical feature in California.

At the time of the accident, Torrey Canyon was registered in Liberia and owned by Barracuda Tanker Corporation, a subsidiary of Union Oil Company of California but chartered to British Petroleum.

Accident
On her final voyage, Torrey Canyon left the Kuwait National Petroleum Company refinery at Mina Al-Ahmadi, Kuwait (later Al-Ahmadi), with a full cargo of crude oil, on 19 February 1967. The ship had an intended destination of Milford Haven in Wales. On 14 March, she reached the Canary Islands. Following a navigational error, Torrey Canyon struck Pollard's Rock on the extreme Western end of the Seven Stones between the Cornish mainland and the Isles of Scilly on 18 March 1967.

The tanker did not have a scheduled route and so lacked a complement of full l-scale charts of the Scilly Islands. When a collision with a fishing fleet became imminent, there was some confusion between the Master and the officer of the watch as to their exact position. Significant further delay arose due to uncertainty as to whether the vessel was in manual or automatic steering mode, with the Master mistakenly believing he had switched the steering to manual for the helmsman. By the time the problem was corrected, a grounding was unavoidable. In the hours and days to follow, extensive attempts to float the vessel off the reef proved unsuccessful and even resulted in the death of a member of the Dutch salvage team, Captain Hans Barend Stal.

After the attempts to move the vessel failed and the ship began to break up, the focus became cleanup and containment of the resulting oil spill. Detergent was deployed on a large scale by Cornwall fire brigade and attending Royal Navy vessels in an attempt to disperse the oil. UK Prime Minister Harold Wilson and his cabinet held a mini cabinet meeting at the Royal Naval Air Station Culdrose and decided to set fire to the vessel and surrounding oil slick to limit the extent of the oil disaster.

On 28 March 1967, the Fleet Air Arm sent Blackburn Buccaneer planes from RNAS Lossiemouth to drop forty-two 1,000-lb bombs on the ship. Then, the Royal Air Force sent Hawker Hunter jets from RAF Chivenor to drop cans of aviation fuel to make the oil blaze. However, exceptionally high tides put the fire out and it took further bombing runs by Sea Vixens from the RNAS Yeovilton and Buccaneers from the Royal Navy Air Station Brawdy, as well as more RAF Hunters with liquified petroleum jelly to ignite the oil. Bombing continued into the next day before Torrey Canyon finally sank. In total some 161 1,000-lb bombs, 11,00 gallons of kerosene, 3,000 gallons of Napalm and 16 other missiles had been aimed at the ship.

Attempts to use foam-filled containment booms were mostly ineffectual, because of the high seas.

Environmental impact
Around 15,000 sea birds were killed, along with huge numbers of marine organisms, before the  slick dispersed. Much damage was caused by the heavy use of so-called detergents to break up the slick – these were first-generation variants of products originally formulated to clean surfaces in ships' engine-rooms, with no concern over the toxicity of their components. Many observers believed that they were officially referred to as 'detergents', rather than the more accurate 'solvent-emulsifiers', to encourage comparison with much more benign domestic cleaning products.

Some 42 vessels sprayed over 10,000 tons of these dispersants onto the floating oil and they were also deployed against oil stranded on beaches.  In Cornwall, they were often misused – for example, by emptying entire 45-gallon drums over the clifftop to 'treat' inaccessible coves or by pouring a steady stream from a low-hovering helicopter. On the heavily oiled beach at Sennen Cove, dispersant pouring from drums was 'ploughed' into the sand by bulldozers over a period of several days, burying the oil so effectively that it could still be found a year or more later.

Some of the oil from the ship was dumped in a quarry on the Chouet headland on Guernsey in the Channel Islands, where it remains. Efforts to rid the island of the oil have continued, with limited success.

Aftermath
The British government was strongly criticised for its handling of the incident, which was at that time the costliest shipping disaster ever. The RAF and the Royal Navy were also subject to ridicule as a result of their efforts to assist in resolving the matter, given that as many as 25% of the 42 bombs that they dropped missed the enormous stationary target.

The British and French governments made claims against the owners of the vessel;
the subsequent settlement was the largest ever in marine history for an oil claim. In traditional maritime law, ships can sue and be sued, but their liability is limited to the value of the ship and its cargo. Liberian law did not provide for direct liability of the ship's owners. The British government was able to serve a writ against the ship's owners only by arresting the Torrey Canyon's sister ship, the Lake Palourde, when she put in for provisions at Singapore, four months after the oil spill. A young British lawyer, Anthony O'Connor, from a Singaporean law firm, Drew & Napier, was deputised to arrest the ship on behalf of the British government by attaching a writ to its mast. O'Connor was able to board the ship and serve the writ because the ship's crew thought he was a whisky salesman. The French government, alerted to the Lake Palourde's presence, pursued the ship with motor boats, but crew were unable to board and serve their writ.

The disaster led to many changes in international regulations, such as the International Convention on Civil Liability for Oil Pollution Damage (CLC) of 1969, which imposed strict liability on ship owners without the need to prove negligence, and the 1973 International Convention for the Prevention of Pollution from Ships.

An inquiry in Liberia, where the ship was registered, found that the Shipmaster, Pastrengo Rugiati, was to blame for having made a bad decision in steering Torrey Canyon between the Scillies and the Seven Stones. The first officer made ill-advised course corrections while the captain slept. Safer course alternatives were discarded because of the pressure to arrive in port at Milford Haven by high tide on 18 March.

The problems of reducing death following "immersion hypothermia" which were highlighted by the disaster led to "development of new techniques for safety and rescue at sea" and changes in the way survivors are winched from the sea.

Two flaws have also been noted in the design of the steering control:
 The steering lever was designed to switch the steering to a "Control mode", intended for use in maintenance only, which disconnected the rudder from the steering wheel.
 The design of the steering selector unit did not provide an indication of the peculiar mode at the helm.

The wreck is now largely broken up and is scattered over a wide area

In popular culture

Botanist David Bellamy came to public prominence as an environmental consultant during the disaster. He made his first prominent TV appearances after publishing a report on the episode. He went on to be a leading environmental and nature campaigner for decades.

In 1967 French singer Serge Gainsbourg wrote a song named "Torrey Canyon" about the disaster.

See also

List of oil spills
SS Wafra oil spill - 1971, also sunk by military aircraft.
Amoco Cadiz oil spill – 1978
MV Braer – 1993
MV Sea Empress – 1996
 Lloyd's Open Form

References

Further reading

External links

 LIFE Magazine April 14, 1967

1967 disasters in the United Kingdom
Maritime incidents in 1967
Oil spills in the United Kingdom
1967 in the environment
Maritime incidents in England
Environmental disasters in the United Kingdom
Water pollution in the United Kingdom
Union Oil Company of California
March 1967 events in the United Kingdom
History of Cornwall
History of the Isles of Scilly
1960s in Cornwall

vi:Vụ tràn dầu Torrey Canyon